Madison Square Garden Bowl was the name of an outdoor arena in the New York City borough of Queens. Built in 1932, the arena hosted circuses and boxing matches. Its seating capacity was 72,000 spectators on wood bleachers. The idea of the stadium came from boxing promotor Tex Rickard, who died before it was completed.

The Bowl, located at 48th Street and Northern Boulevard in Long Island City, was the site where James J. Braddock defeated Max Baer for the World Heavyweight title on June 13, 1935, a fight later dramatized in the film Cinderella Man. Braddock's first comeback fight against John "Corn" Griffin was also in the venue. Jack Sharkey and Primo Carnera also captured the heavyweight crown in the 1930s at the Bowl. But because no titleholder ever successfully defended his title there, the stadium was soon dubbed the "Jinx Bowl".

The Madison Square Garden Bowl was torn down during World War II to make way for a US Army Mail Depot (and also because arena management deemed it more economical to rent baseball stadiums for fights). Metal from the stadium was melted down to make bullets and other war materials, including those to build the Mail Depot. The depot itself was torn down in the 1960s, and the area is now home to a Major World used-car dealership and strip mall.

See also
 Madison Square Garden (1879), Madison Avenue and East 26th Street
 Madison Square Garden (1890), Madison Avenue and East 26th Street
 Madison Square Garden (1925), Eighth Avenue and 50th Street
 Madison Square Garden (1968), 4 Pennsylvania Plaza, Seventh to Eighth Avenues and 31st to 33rd Streets

References

External links
Venue information
"Yes, There Really Was a Fifth Madison Garden"
https://www.nytimes.com/2005/06/12/nyregion/thecity/for-a-forgotten-arena-an-unexpected-star-turn.html

1932 establishments in New York City
Defunct boxing venues in the United States
Boxing venues in New York City
Sports venues in Queens, New York
Demolished sports venues in New York (state)
Former sports venues in New York City
Long Island City
Sports venues completed in 1932
1945 disestablishments in New York (state)
Sports venues demolished in 1945